"Child's Play" is the 139th episode of Star Trek: Voyager, the 19th episode of the sixth season. Icheb (played by guest star Manu Intiraymi) takes center-stage as the crew of the USS Voyager spacehip once again grapple with the cybernetic Borg aliens, and their impact on the Delta Quadrant.

Plot
Captain Janeway informs Seven of Nine that the parents of Icheb, one of the children Seven has been taking care of, have been located and he is going to have to leave Voyager.

When they near Icheb's home planet, readings indicate there is a Borg transwarp conduit nearby and the planet has been attacked by the Borg several times. When Janeway, Seven, Icheb and Tuvok beam to the surface they meet the Brunali, who live in huts. The Brunali explain that they have to keep things low-tech or the Borg will detect them and attack the planet again.

After meeting Icheb's parents, Leucon and Yifay, the away team and Icheb's parents return to Voyager and discuss how to make the transition easier. While on board, Leucon explains to Seven that the Borg took Icheb four years ago when he wandered off to see a new fertilization array. After spending time with his parents, Icheb decides to stay with the Brunali, despite Seven's protests.

As Voyager leaves the planet Seven begins to research the circumstances of Icheb's assimilation. She discovers that the Borg did not attack the planet four years ago, meaning Leucon was lying. When Seven gives this information to Janeway, the Captain turns the ship around and heads back to the Brunali planet.

Meanwhile, on the Brunali world, Icheb's parents grab him and inject him with an alien medical device. The device renders Icheb unconscious and his parents put him on a shuttle heading for the Borg transwarp conduit.

When Voyager returns to the planet, Seven discovers the shuttle heading for Borg space and Voyager pursues. Seven manages to transport Icheb onto Voyager just as a Borg sphere emerges from the conduit and traps both the shuttle and Voyager in a tractor beam. The crew transports a photon torpedo to the shuttle, which detonates inside the sphere and damages it, allowing Voyager to escape.

After leaving with Icheb the Doctor determines that Icheb had been genetically engineered with anti-Borg pathogens, suggesting his parents had raised him specifically to infect the Borg (as seen in the earlier episode, "Collective") and stop the attacks on their planet. Seven begins to help Icheb understand that as an individual he can determine his own destiny.

Reception
In 2019, SyFy recommend this episode for their Seven of Nine binge-watching guide. This episode is noted for featuring the Borg aliens and fictional biological weapons.

Continuity 
The  ex-Borg teenager Icheb was previously introduced in the episode "Collective (S6E16), after which Icheb became a recurring character for the remainder of show's run. Icheb also returns in Star Trek: Picard season one.

Releases 
This episode was released as part of a season 6 DVD boxset on December 7, 2004.

References

External links
 

Star Trek: Voyager (season 6) episodes
2000 American television episodes